Shanto is a form of Guyanese music.

Shanto may also refer to:

 Shanto (Wolaita), a town in Wolaita, Ethiopia
 Shanto Iyengar, American political scientist and academic
 Najmul Hossain Shanto (born 1998), Bangladeshi cricketer
 Vasil Shanto (1913–1944), Albanian politician

See also
 
 Shantou (disambiguation)